Armas Tolonen (30 July 1893, Kivennapa – 26 November 1954) was a Finnish politician. He was a Member of the Parliament of Finland from 1949 to 1951, representing the Social Democratic Party of Finland (SDP).

References

1893 births
1954 deaths
People from Vyborg District
People from Viipuri Province (Grand Duchy of Finland)
Social Democratic Party of Finland politicians
Members of the Parliament of Finland (1948–51)